Marian Zieliński (24 December 1929 – 13 October 2005) was a Polish weightlifter. He competed at the 1956, 1960, 1964 and 1968 Olympics and won bronze medals in 1956, 1964 and 1968, placing fourth in 1960.
He held the world and European titles in 1959 and 1963. Zieliński set three ratified world records: two in the snatch in 1958 and one in the clean and jerk in 1964.

Zieliński took up weightlifting in the early 1950s, and retired in 1970. He then coached weightlifters until 1978, and after that worked as a painter, sculptor and jeweler. He was married to Jadwiga Nienartowicz and had two sons, Andrzej (born 1958) and Mark (born 1960), both live in Canada.

References

1929 births
2005 deaths
Polish male weightlifters
Olympic weightlifters of Poland
Weightlifters at the 1956 Summer Olympics
Weightlifters at the 1960 Summer Olympics
Weightlifters at the 1964 Summer Olympics
Weightlifters at the 1968 Summer Olympics
Olympic bronze medalists for Poland
People from Chełm
Olympic medalists in weightlifting
Sportspeople from Lublin Voivodeship
Medalists at the 1968 Summer Olympics
Medalists at the 1964 Summer Olympics
Medalists at the 1956 Summer Olympics
European Weightlifting Championships medalists
World Weightlifting Championships medalists
21st-century Polish people
20th-century Polish people